John Zibell is an independent actor/writer/director who has worked in New York City and Regional Theater and film.

Life

Zibell studied acting with Mike Nichols, Paul Sills and George Morrison at the New Actors Workshop in Manhattan. He appeared in the film The War Within and wrote, directed and acted in the movie Sex and Violence (film). 
He won the Audience Award/Best Directorial Debut at the NY International Independent Film Festival.

John has worked with Paul Sills, Dianne Paulus (The Donkey Show) and with director Shira Piven (Piven Theatre, Chicago; and Water, New York).  He has also been a member of several grass-roots theater companies performing original work including Sills and Company and Blue Circle Theater (also with Ms. Paulus and Mr. Sills).

Zibell originated the role of Jimmy Patraglia in Joe Roland's off-Broadway play On The Line.

In Fall 2010 he worked as assistant to performance artist Guillermo Gomez Pena on the UC Davis production of Gomez Pena's Corpo Ilicito. He has also performed with Gomez-Pena's San Francisco-based troupe La Pocha Nostra.

Zibell received his MFA in directing theatre the department of theatre and dance from UC Davis in June 2010.

He was a 3rd-year PhD candidate in Performance Studies at UC Davis. Building on his career in theater and cinema Zibell has focused his scholarship on traditional knowledge systems and new media. He writes on the figures of the cyborg and the shaman.

Zibell lived in Los Angeles but now teaches Film modules in the North of England.

External links

American male film actors
Male actors from New York (state)
University of California, Davis alumni
1966 births
Living people